Robert Thomson Barbour (4 March 1845 – 29 November 1914) was an Australian politician.

Born in Glasgow to stonemason John Humphrey Barbour and Sarah Thomson, he arrived in Victoria in 1856 and became a clerk with the Public Works Department. He eventually became a quantity surveyor and a member of the Melbourne Tramways Trust, as well as a Hawthorn City Councillor (1891–1914, mayor 1894–95, 1913–14). On 4 March 1872 he married Agnes Crocket, with whom he had six children. In 1900 he was elected to the Victorian Legislative Assembly as the member for Hawthorn, serving until his defeat in 1902. Barbour died at Hawthorn in 1914.

References

Year of birth uncertain
1914 deaths
Members of the Victorian Legislative Assembly
Scottish emigrants to colonial Australia
Politicians from Glasgow
Victoria (Australia) local councillors
Mayors of places in Victoria (Australia)
People from Hawthorn, Victoria
Politicians from Melbourne